The Affairs of Jimmy Valentine is a 1942 American comedy crime film directed by Bernard Vorhaus and starring Dennis O'Keefe, Ruth Terry, and Gloria Dickson.

The film is also known as Unforgotten Crime (American TV title) and Find Jimmy Valentine. The original film was cut to 53 minutes due to its B-movie billing and later for television. The film was based on the 1910 play, Alias Jimmy Valentine, by Paul Armstrong.

Plot 
To boost listener ratings, radio personality Mike Jason (Dennis O'Keefe) encourages sponsors, of his murder mystery radio show, to offer a reward to anyone who can locate safe cracker Jimmy Valentine, who is reportedly retired. The reward for the person who finds the legendary gentleman burglar is set to $10,000.

There's little tough guy Mousey (George Stone), who becomes over zealous over the possibility of winning the reward. Valentine is rumored to have thrown down his hat in a picturesque small town called Fernville in Illinois. Jason and co-worker Cleo Arden (Gloria Dickson) lead the hunt, together with Mousey, and it takes them to the small and previously quiet town.

The search begins in the small town's local newspaper, where Jason hopes to find some old files that can reveal Jimmy Valentine's whereabouts. Jason meets the daughter of the newspaper editor, Bonnie Forbes (Ruth Terry), who takes him to see her father, Tom Forbes (Roman Bohnen).

It turns out Tom isn't willing to help out in the search for Valentine. But Bonnie has taken a romantic interest in Jason, and offers to help out. She takes the party to Tom's gardener, Pinky (Harry Shannon), who she has heard tell stories about Valentine in the past.

The lead is a dead end, as Pinky claims to know nothing about Valentine of use to Jason. But when Jason and Mousey visits the Forbes' house, Mousey finds Pinky rummaging about in Tom's office, destroying old files, and there is a photo of Pinky when he was younger, where his hair color matches the color of Valentine's side kick back in the day.

Mousey turns out to be the son of an infamous mobster who was framed by Valentine, and kills Pinky to revenge his father. When Jason finds out about the killing, he suspects Valentine of being the murderer. He goes about town to collect fingerprints of important persons, and stirs up the whole town, since they are all ex-convicts, having settled down in this peaceful place to live a quiet law-abiding life.

The fingerprints are stored in a safe at the sheriff's office, and Jason plans to ambush Valentine and catch him red-handed when he tries to crack the safe open to get hold of the prints. Just as planned, Jason catches Tom, who turns out to be Jimmy Valentine, as he breaks the safe. In an effort to save the rest of the town from being caught, Tom wants to give Jason his prints in exchange for all the others'.

Mousey enters the scene and tries to get his revenge on Tom/Jimmy. Mousey manages to kill himself, and Jason realizes that Tom/Jimmy wasn't the one who killed Pinky. Jason tells the police that Pinky was Jimmy Valentine in disguise, thus saving Tom and his daughter from ruin. Then Jason decides to stay in the small town with Bonnie.

Cast 

Dennis O'Keefe as Mike Jason
Ruth Terry as Bonnie Forbes
Gloria Dickson as Cleo Arden
Roman Bohnen as Tom Forbes / Jimmy Valentine
George E. Stone as Mousey
Spencer Charters as Cheevers Snow
William B. Davidson as Cyrus Ballard
Roscoe Ates as Dan Kady
Bobby Larson as Mickey Forbes
Joe Cunningham as Charles Stanton
Harry Shannon as Pinky
Jed Prouty as Maxwell B. Titus
Patsy Parsons as Marlene Titus
Linda Brent as Letitia Hinkle
Wade Boteler as Warden Carl Jones
Emmett Vogan as District Attorney
Ray Erlenborn as Sound Effects Man
Olaf Hytten as Butler
Lois Collier as Receptionist
William "Billy" Benedict as Bellboy
Dorothy Christy as Mrs. Updyke
Guy Usher as Inspector
Douglas Evans as Announcer
Sven Hugo Borg as Olaf
Al Bridge as Trustee
Fred Burns as Westerner
Mary Davenport as Hotel Telephone Operator
Virginia Farmer as Mrs. Brighton
Dick Elliott as Tim Miller
Charles Williams as The Pitchman
Mary Currier as Felice Winters
Joel Friedkin
Jack Raymond as Hot Dog Man
Jimmie Fox as Window Cleaner
Edmund Cobb as Sergeant
Frank Fanning as Wilbur
Ben Hall as Attendant
Ralph Peters
Sada Simmons
Morgan Brown
Margaret Marquis
Rand Brooks

References

External links 
 
 

1942 films
1940s crime comedy-drama films
American black-and-white films
American crime comedy-drama films
Films scored by Samuel Kaylin
Films directed by Bernard Vorhaus
1940s English-language films
1940s American films